Brno-City District is a district in the South Moravian Region of the Czech Republic. The district is coterminous with the city of Brno.

Geography
Brno-City District has a hilly and forested character in the northwestern part and flat and deforested in the southeastern part. On the border of these landscapes there is a large built-up area of the city. The territory extends into three geomorphological mesoregions: Bobrava Highlands (west and centre), Dyje–Svratka Valley (south and east), and Drahany Highlands (north).

The Svratka River flows across the territory from west to south. The only notable body of water is the Brno Reservoir, built on the Svratka in the western part of the territory.

Small part of the Moravian Karst Protected landscape Area extends into the district in the norteast.

Demographics

References

External links

Brno-City District profile on the Czech Statistical Office's website

 
Districts of the Czech Republic